Benjamin Robert Stephenson (April 10, 1835 – January 16, 1890) was a lawyer and political figure in New Brunswick, Canada. He represented Charlotte County in the Legislative Assembly of New Brunswick as a Liberal member from 1867 to 1882. His surname also appears as Stevenson in some sources.

He was born in St. Andrews, New Brunswick, the son of Robert Stephenson, and was educated there and at the University of New Brunswick. Stephenson was called to the bar in 1860 and, in 1866, he married Kate Bolton, the sister of John Bolton, who represented Charlotte in the federal parliament. He served as registrar of probates for the county. Stephenson was named to the Executive Council of New Brunswick as Surveyor General in 1871. He served as speaker for the legislative assembly from 1879 to 1882. He died in 1890.

References

The Canadian parliamentary companion for 1875, HJ Morgan

1835 births
1890 deaths
University of New Brunswick alumni
Lawyers in New Brunswick
Members of the Executive Council of New Brunswick
Speakers of the Legislative Assembly of New Brunswick
People from Saint Andrews, New Brunswick
New Brunswick Liberal Association MLAs